Choolannur Pea Fowl Sanctuary is a bird sanctuary located in Chulanur village in Palakkad district of Kerala state, south India. The place where sanctuary is located is locally known as Mayiladumpara which literally means 'the rock where peacocks dance'. At present (2022) it is the only Pea fowl sanctuary in Kerala.

History
As per government order numbered G.O.(P) 24/2007/F&WLD, Choolannur Peafowl Sanctuary was established in 15 May 2007.

Description
Choolannur Peafowl Sanctuary is a located in Chulanur village in Palakkad district of Kerala. The sanctuary is located locally known as Mayiladumpara which literally means 'the rock where peacocks dance'. This bird sanctuary is under the jurisdiction of the Peechi Forest Division and was established in the memory of the famous Indian ornithologist and writer Induchoodan.

Apart from peacocks, hundreds of species of birds can also be seen here. At present (2022) it is the only Peafowl sanctuary in Kerala.

Society and culture
When Rajasthan High Court Justice Mahesh Chandra Sharma's remark that peacocks do not mate and that female peacocks conceive from the tears of male peacocks was highly controversial, the number of visitors to the peacock sanctuary increased.

References

Wildlife sanctuaries in Kerala
Wildlife sanctuaries of the Western Ghats
Protected areas of Kerala
2007 establishments in Kerala
Protected areas established in 2007